The Commonwealth of Virginia is divided into 95 counties, along with 38 independent cities that are considered county-equivalents for census purposes. The map in this article, taken from the official United States Census Bureau site, includes Clifton Forge and Bedford as independent cities. This reflected the political reality at the time of the 2000 Census. However, both have since chosen to revert to town status.  In Virginia, cities are co-equal levels of government to counties, but towns are part of counties. For some counties, for statistical purposes, the Bureau of Economic Analysis combines any independent cities with the county that it was once part of (before the legislation creating independent cities took place in 1871).

Many county seats are politically not a part of the counties they serve; under Virginia law, all municipalities incorporated as cities are independent cities and are not part of any county. Some of the cities in the Hampton Roads area (Virginia Beach, Chesapeake, Newport News, Hampton, and Suffolk) were formed from an entire county. These cities are no longer county seats, since the counties ceased to exist once the cities were completely formed, but are functionally equivalent to counties. Also in Virginia, a county seat may be an independent city surrounded by, but not part of, the county of which it is the administrative center; for example, Fairfax City is both the county seat of Fairfax County and is completely surrounded by Fairfax County but the city is politically independent of the county.

There are 38 independent cities, which are considered county-equivalents for census purposes.  Many towns are as large as cities, but are not incorporated as cities and are situated within a parent county or counties.  Seven independent cities had 2020 populations of less than 10,000 with the smallest, Norton having a population of only 3,687.  In 2020, the largest towns were Leesburg (with 48,250 people) and Blacksburg (44,826).  Six other towns also had populations of over 10,000 people.  For a complete list of these towns, see List of towns in Virginia.  For major unincorporated population centers, see List of unincorporated communities in Virginia.

Virginia's independent cities were classified by the Virginia General Assembly in 1871 as cities of the first class and cities of the second class.  The Virginia Constitution of 1902 defined first class cities as those having a population of 10,000 or more based upon the last census enumeration while second class cities were those that had a population of less than 10,000.  Cities that previously been granted a city charter, but did not have the requisite population, had their status grandfathered in.  Second class did not have a court of record and were required to share the cost of that court with their adjacent county and also shared the cost for three constitutional officers of that court—generally, the clerk, commonwealth attorney and sheriff—and those shared officers stood for election in both the city and the county.  At least two constitutional officers—treasurer and commissioner of the revenue—were required to be elected solely by the residents of the city.  The distinction between first and second class cities was ended with the Virginia Constitution of 1971.  However, cities that were classified as second class cities at the time of the adoption of the 1971 Virginia Constitution were authorized to continue sharing their court system and three constitutional officers with the adjacent county.  , 14 of Virginia's independent cities retain these features.

There are several counties and cities that have the same name, but are separate politically. These currently include Fairfax, Franklin, Richmond, and Roanoke. In the past they also included Norfolk and Alexandria, whose counties changed their names, ostensibly to end some of the confusion; as well as Bedford, where a city was surrounded by a county of the same name from 1968 until 2013, when the city reverted to town status. A city and county that share a name may be completely unrelated in geography. For example, Richmond County is nowhere near the City of Richmond, and Franklin County is even farther from the City of Franklin.

More Virginia counties are named for women than in any other state.

Virginia's postal abbreviation is VA and its FIPS state code is 51.

List of the 95 counties in the Commonwealth of Virginia (links shown under FIPS County Code are for the U.S. Census Bureau Statistics Info Page for that county):

Clickable map

List of counties

|}

List of independent cities

|}

Largest cities

Fictional counties
 The 2016 supernatural horror film The Autopsy of Jane Doe is set in Grantham County, located close to the city of Richmond. 
 The Netflix drama miniseries Echoes takes place in Easton County and the county seat of Mt. Echo.

See also
Administrative divisions of Virginia
List of former counties, cities, and towns of Virginia
 List of counties of Kentucky
 List of counties of West Virginia

References

Virginia
 
Counties
Virginia